Cibitoke Province is one of the 18 provinces of Republic of Burundi.

Communes
It is divided administratively into the following communes:

 Commune of Buganda
 Commune of Bukinanyana
 Commune of Mabayi
 Commune of Mugina
 Commune of Murwi
 Commune of Rugombo

References

 
Provinces of Burundi